Fiskå may refer to:

Fiskå, Rogaland, a village in Strand municipality, Rogaland county, Norway
Fiskåbygd, or simply Fiskå, a village in Vanylven municipality, Møre og Romsdal county, Norway
Fiskåtangen, or simply Fiskå, a borough in the city of Kristiansand in Agder county, Norway